is a railway station of Chūō Main Line, East Japan Railway Company (JR East) in Nagasaka, in the city of Hokuto, Yamanashi Prefecture, Japan.

Lines
Hinoharu Station is served by the Chūō Main Line, and is 160.1 kilometers from the terminus of the line at Tokyo Station.

Station layout
The station consists of one ground level side platform and one ground level island platform, connected to the wooden station building by a footbridge. The station is staffed.

Platforms

History
Hinoharu Station opened on December 21, 1904 a station on the Japanese Government Railways (JGR) Chūō Main Line. The station was built as a watering point for steam locomotives, which were still used on the line until August 1964. A freshwater spring, called the Hino spring, occupied this location, and was a noted local landmark due to an ancient pine tree from which local legend stated that Takeda Shingen once hung his battle standard. When the government appropriated the land for the station, the local landowner insisted that the tree be spared. However, through neglect and due to smoke from the locomotives, the pine tree died in 1914. Descendants of the owner sued the Railroad Ministry in 1917, and won the case in 1919. A monument was erected in front of the station on the location of the pine tree in 1933 to commemorate the incident. The JGR became the JNR (Japanese National Railways) after the end of World War II. Scheduled freight services were discontinued from February 1972.  With the dissolution and privatization of the JNR on April 1, 1987, the station came under the control of the East Japan Railway Company.

Passenger statistics
In fiscal 2017, the station was used by an average of 590 passengers daily (boarding passengers only).

Surrounding area
Hinoharu post office

See also
 List of railway stations in Japan

References

 Miyoshi Kozo. Chuo-sen Machi to eki Hyaku-niju nen. JT Publishing (2009)

External links

JR East Hinoharu Station

Railway stations in Yamanashi Prefecture
Railway stations in Japan opened in 1904
Stations of East Japan Railway Company
Chūō Main Line
Hokuto, Yamanashi